Estby is a surname. Notable people with the surname include:

Fred Estby (born 1972), Swedish drummer
Helga Estby (1860–1942), American suffragist

See also
Estey (surname)